Michael F. Uschold (born 1955) is an American computer scientist, Artificial Intelligence researcher, and consultant, known for his work on knowledge representation and ontology.

Biography 
Uschold received his BA in Mathematics and Physics in 1977 from the Canisius College, his MS in Computer Science in 1981 from Rutgers University, and his PhD in Artificial Intelligence in 1991 from the University of Edinburgh.

In 1983 Uschold joined the faculty of the University of Edinburgh, Department of Artificial Intelligence as researcher and lecturer, and later moved to its Artificial Intelligence Applications Institute. In 1997 he left the academic world and became Research Scientist at Boeing Phantom Works, a division of The Boeing Company, specialized in advanced prototyping. In 2007 he became Senior Ontologist in a computer science consultancy firm, in 2009 he started as independent consultant, and since 2010 participates in a management consultancy firm.

Uschold's research interests and expertise is in the field of "Software concept design and architecture; Facilitation, Analysis & Modeling; Asking probing question, getting to the heart of the matter; Communication of complex information in simple terms. Writing, speaking, presenting; Constructive reviewing and critiquing; and Semantic technology."

Selected publications
Papers and articles, a selection:
 Uschold, Michael, and Martin King. Towards a methodology for building ontologies. Artificial Intelligence Applications Institute, University of Edinburgh, 1995.
 Uschold, Michael. Building ontologies: Towards a unified methodology. Technical. Report AIAI-TR-195, Artificial Intelligence Applications Institute, The University of Edinburgh, 1996.
 Uschold, Mike, and Michael Gruninger. "Ontologies: Principles, methods and applications." Knowledge engineering review 11.2 (1996): 93–136.
 Uschold, M., King, M., Moralee, S., & Zorgios, Y. (1998). "The enterprise ontology." The knowledge engineering review, 13(01), 31–89.
 Jasper, Robert, and Mike Uschold. "A framework for understanding and classifying ontology applications." Proceedings 12th Int. Workshop on Knowledge Acquisition, Modelling, and Management KAW. Vol. 99. 1999.

References

External links 
 semanticarts.com

Living people
Artificial intelligence researchers
American computer scientists
Canisius College alumni
Rutgers University alumni
Alumni of the University of Edinburgh
Academics of the University of Edinburgh
Enterprise modelling experts
1955 births